Donald J. Kennedy (born March 2, 1930) is an American radio and television personality and voice talent, whose career began in the late 1940s with a radio announcer spot on Pennsylvania station WPIC.

In the mid-1950s, Kennedy was a contributor to the NBC Radio Network weekend show "Monitor," where he developed several features, including one about a local character known as the Goat Man.

Kennedy is remembered as Officer Don, the host of the long-running Atlanta children's TV show The Popeye Club.  It was seen on Channel 2 WSB-TV from 1956 to 1970. During his time at the Popeye Club, Kennedy established 96.1 WKLS (now WWPW), an Atlanta FM radio station, serving as station President and General Manager.  The "K" in the call sign was for his last name.

Kennedy later did movie voicework, playing Tansit in Space Ghost Coast to Coast, and several characters on The Brak Show and Aqua Teen Hunger Force. In 1986, he began hosting "Big Band Jump," an internationally syndicated radio show devoted to music from the Big Band era. He later added a second syndicated program, the self-titled "Don Kennedy Show," that featured general pop vocals and instrumentals from the 1940s through the 1970s, as well as modern renditions from the Great American Songbook. He was also the voice of a kiddie ride based on Superman: The Animated Series made by British manufacturer Jolly Roger, providing a newly-recorded version of the classic Superman radio show intro narration.

Kennedy is the recipient of several awards including the Silver Circle Award, two Emmys, awards from Pioneer Broadcaster and Georgia Broadcaster’s Hall of Fame, and honorary membership in the Di Gamma Kappa Broadcast Fraternity at the University of Georgia.  Kennedy has supported several causes including serving as President of the Georgia Chapter of Muscular Dystrophy, treasurer of the Atlanta Humane Society, board member of the Atlanta chapter of the American Cancer Society, as well as volunteering as a reader for the Georgia Radio Reading Service for the Blind.

During the summer of 2013, Don Kennedy announced that he would be retiring from radio, ending his work on the syndicated "Big Band Jump" and "Don Kennedy Show." The final broadcasts of both programs took place on the weekend of September 28–29, 2013.

Television character actor Don Kennedy (also known as Derrick Slaugenhaupt, born 1921) is often confused with radio personality Don Kennedy above. Their information and credits are intertwined on the Internet Movie Data Base. The character actor appeared in many television shows in the 1950s and 1960s such as The Rifleman.

Partial filmography
 Aqua Teen Hunger Force (various episodes, 2001–2010) (TV) as Assisted Living Dracula, Vegetable Man & Rubberman (Lance Potter)
 The Brak Show (2001–2003) (TV) as Morlun, Poppy
 Space Ghost Coast to Coast (various episodes, 1994–1999) (TV) as Tansit, Bill Manspeaker
 Acme Radio Hour (1995) (TV)

References

External links
 

1930 births
Living people
American male voice actors
American radio personalities
People from Beaver, Pennsylvania